Constance Alice Lloyd (9 May 1895 – 5 February 1982) was a New Zealand artist who specialised in etching. Her work is part of the permanent collection of the Auckland Art Gallery Toi o Tāmaki.

Biography 
Lloyd was born at Wainui, north of Auckland, on 9 May 1895. Her father Trevor Lloyd was an illustrator and cartoonist, who became interested in etching after his daughters Connie and Olive studied it at Elam School of Fine Arts in Auckland. Connie Lloyd learned the art of etching from A.J.C. Fisher, the principal of Elam School of Art. Lloyd's work is predominantly based on the landscape near Auckland and uses drypoint and aquatint methods.

In 1929, Lloyd exhibited work at the New Zealand Academy of Fine Arts annual exhibition, and in 1940 exhibited at the Auckland Society of Arts annual exhibition. In 1931, she exhibited with four other women artists at the Waikato Society of Arts in Hamilton.

Lloyd died on 5 February 1982, and her body was cremated at Purewa Crematorium, Auckland.

References

1895 births
1982 deaths
People from the Auckland Region
20th-century New Zealand artists
20th-century New Zealand women artists
Women etchers
Etchers